My Life in the Bush of Ghosts may refer to:
My Life in the Bush of Ghosts (novel), 1954 novel by Amos Tutuola
My Life in the Bush of Ghosts (album), 1981 album by Brian Eno and David Byrne, titled after Tutuola's novel